Bukowno  is a village in the administrative district of Gmina Olsztyn, within Częstochowa County, Silesian Voivodeship, in southern Poland.

The village has a population of 281.

References

Bukowno